Sir Frederick Horace Smirk  (12 December 1902 – 18 May 1991) was a notable New Zealand professor of medicine. He was born in Accrington, Lancashire, England, in 1902.

In the 1958 Queen's Birthday Honours, Smirk was appointed a Knight Commander of the Order of the British Empire.

References

1902 births
1991 deaths
20th-century New Zealand medical doctors
English emigrants to New Zealand
New Zealand Knights Commander of the Order of the British Empire
Academic staff of the University of Otago